Genge music, or genge,  is a genre of hip hop music with additional influences from dancehall music that has its beginnings in Nairobi, Kenya. The name was coined by the producer Clemo and popularized by Kenyan rappers Jua Cali and Nonini, who started off at Calif Records, and is commonly sung in Sheng (Swahili and English slang), Swahili or local dialects. The term Genge is a Sheng word for "a group or a mass of people".

Origins and characteristics

As Kenyan urban music became more and more popular, Kenyan artists and music fans wanted to have a common name for their music, and many names were suggested. Among them were Boomba music, kapuka, and gemba. Around this time, Nonini started a campaign to popularize the term "genge" to refer to Kenyan urban music and also specifically music by artists on Calif Records.

Calif-style genge was originated by Clement "Clemo" Rapudo of Calif Records and located in California Estate, Nairobi. It was popularized by rappers, including Nonini with his song Manzi wa Nairobi and Jua Cali with the songs: Ngeli ya Genge, Nipe Asali and Ruka. Due to disagreement on the definition of Kenyan urban music, the name genge is now more commonly used to describe music from Calif Records. However, genge is easily identified by its rapping style and conversational rhythm format that makes a song sound like a casual discussion in sheng.

The most notable genge artists are Nonini, P-Unit, Jua Cali, Influx Swagga,  Flexx, Jimw@t, Rat-a-tat, Alpha Msanii, Lady S (deceased), and Pili Pili among others. Nonini was continuously the most popular artist on the Calif Records between the year 2002 and 2004 when he left for Homeboyz Productions. Jua Cali, who stayed with Calif Records, is the de facto king of genge; with his song, Kwaheri - a collaboration with the Sanaipei Tande - being one of his most popular. Nonini is the self-titled Godfather of Genge.

Genge has given rise to other subgenres such as the Ghipuka popularized by Kenrazy. However, it remains a formidable force, as America-based producer Keggah has added a fresh flavor to give genge a new sound that has proved popular amongst Kenyans.

After years of silence from genge artists, in June 2018, an Umoja-based boy band called Ethic Entertainment, came out with their debut song "Lamba Lolo" a song that garnered over 4 million views on YouTube. Other boy bands like Boondocks Gang, Ochungulo Family, Sailors Gang, Wakali Wao, Angry Panda, Wakadinali, Vintage Clan, Rico Gang came out and produced songs that created the subgenre Gengetone,which has significant influence from dancehall music. Genge is also popular in the Nairoby ghettos, with many youth releasing their own songs.

These songs generally talk about their struggles in the ghetto, with most songs usually taking on a storytelling format where the main singer is reliving or sharing an event they witnessed with their friends and the lesson the event has taught them. These events often, but not always, revolve around sex, marijuana, women, or interactions with people in positions of power over them.

On 27 August 2019, the hit banger "Wamlambez" by Sailors_254 was banned by KFCB for its obscene lyrics from public airing and was restricted it only in clubs and bars. It was regarded to be "pure pornography" by former KFCB boss Dr. Ezekiel Mutua. The song became a national catchphrase even by students, youths, and even notable politicians like former Prime Minister Raila Odinga had been seen dancing to it.

Some of the most popular genge tracks include:

See also
Kenyan hip hop
Boomba, another form of Kenyan hip-hop

References

Kenyan hip hop
Kenyan music
Hip hop genres
African-American music in Africa
Swahili words and phrases